At the 1956 Winter Olympics, four speed skating events were contested. This was the last edition in which only men participated. The competitions were held from Saturday, 28 January, to Tuesday, 31 January 1956.

Medal summary

Participating nations
A total of 18 nations competed in the 4 events.
Ten speed skaters competed in all four events.

Medal table

References

External links
International Olympic Committee results database
 

 
1956 Winter Olympics events
1956
Olympics, 1956